The Federal Firearms Act of 1938 (FFA) imposed a federal license requirement on gun manufacturers, importers, and persons in the business of selling firearms. The term federal firearms licensee (FFL) is used to refer to those on whom the license requirement is imposed. "FFL" is also used to refer to the license itself.

In addition to the licensing component of the FFA, the law required licensees to maintain customer records, and it made illegal the transfer of firearms to certain classes of persons, such as convicted felons. These classes of persons are commonly referred to as "prohibited persons." The circumstances resulting in the prohibition (such as a felony conviction) are often referred to as "disabilities." The FFA was repealed by the Gun Control Act of 1968 (GCA), though many of its provisions were reenacted as part of the GCA, which revised the FFA and its predecessor, the National Firearms Act of 1934 (NFA).

The FFA was enforced by the Alcohol Tax Unit, one of the precursors of the Bureau of Alcohol, Tobacco, Firearms and Explosives.

See also
Firearm Owners Protection Act - Significantly amended the GCA and eased many of the restrictions on firearms sellers.
Gun law in the United States

References

External links

15 U.S. Code § 901 to 910 - Repealed

1938 in American law
75th United States Congress
Gun politics in the United States
United States federal criminal legislation
United States federal firearms legislation
United States federal privacy legislation
June 1938 events